Linguistics and Philosophy is a peer reviewed journal addressing "structure and meaning in natural language". This journal, along with Studies in Language, is a continuation of the journal Foundations of Language (1965 to 1976).

The current Editors-in-Chief are Regine Eckardt (University of Konstanz) and Dilip Ninan (Tufts University).

External links 

 Linguistics and Philosophy — official website @ Springer Science+Business Media

Logic journals
Linguistics journals
Publications established in 1977
English-language journals
Springer Science+Business Media academic journals
Philosophy of language literature
Philosophy journals